Henry Hill is a mountain in the town of Berne in Albany County, New York. It is located southeast of Huntersland.  It is directly south of the Partridge Run State Forest. Cook Hill is located northwest and Garver Hill is located west-southwest of Henry Hill. Henry Hill is the tallest point in Albany County and it is ranked 25 of 62 on the list of New York County High Points.

References

Mountains of Albany County, New York
Mountains of New York (state)